Singapore Sling: The Man Who Loved a Corpse (tr. Singapore Sling: O Ánthropos pou Agápise éna Ptóma) is a 1990 Greek black and white horror underground art film directed by Nikos Nikolaidis and regarded as his magnum opus. Considered a difficult film to label while still managing to develop something of a cult following throughout the years nonetheless, it was shot in a bizarre manner somewhat resembling film noir or neo-noir and black comedy as well as the exploitation, thriller, and crime genres mixed with some elements of eroticism and horror with sex being used as a power game and received a theatrical release in Greece on 6 December 1990.

Despite Nikolaidis' career as a film director in his home country which stretches to the early 1960s he was almost entirely unknown outside Greece before the early 1990s and is still less known outside it.  It was only with this film, which has immediately achieved cult status, that international fame came to him and it probably still remains the film for which he is best known today, as exemplified by the fact that it was released on DVD by Synapse Films, the only one of Nikolaidis' films to so far receive a home video release in North America. The film was officially selected for screening at the Rimini Film Festival.

Plot
Two mentally ill women who are clearly suffering from not otherwise specified delusional disorders, a mother and a (grown) daughter, live together in a secluded mansion. They are in a relationship and both are recognised for their beauty. They spend their days playing perverse BDSM-related incestuous games in memory of their sadistic patriarch who, when he was still alive, raped his daughter when she was eleven, murdered several servants, and is now a mummified corpse with which the daughter is shown having sex. They occasionally kill their servants and bury their bodies in the garden.

When first glimpsed the psychotic mother-daughter protagonists, half-dressed, are burying their disemboweled chauffeur into a pit, they have just finished to dig in their backyard on a dark and stormy night with thunder and heavy rain. They lay down their shovels and drag out of the bushes, his fresh corpse. He was killed in one of their usual games combining incestuous sex with murder. Shortly after this and at first unnoticed by the two women, a lovesick detective pulls his car up to the residence. He is suffering from a painful bullet wound and an equally painful yearning to track down Laura, his long-missing beloved for whom he has been searching for three years and about whom it is known that she has visited the area. What he does not yet know is that he has stumbled onto the lair of two profoundly insane women who have already lured Laura into their home and brutally killed her (in the process decorating their kitchen with her viscera, as a flashback helpfully shows). It is also revealed that the daughter is physically very similar to Laura and is desperately looking for a man's companionship.

The duo then easily take the seriously wounded and bleeding detective, having already figured them out to be responsible for Laura's kidnapping, into their home, essentially kidnapping him. As the exhausted detective was silent and apparently refuses to speak, even in order to state his own name, the two women christen him 'Singapore Sling', after they discover a recipe in his pocket notebook for that type of cocktail. They use him as a pawn in their sexually tinged role-playing games and as a party to their distorted and perverse form of entertainment, during which Singapore Sling, now a prisoner, is tied up, chained to a bed, vomited on, electrocuted, used as a sex slave, and subjected to various other forms of torture and atrocities in which he is forced to participate. However, as Singapore Sling's confinement wears on he regains his strength and takes a more active role in the games. His deranged captors become concerned and alarmed when a sharp kitchen knife, belonging to the late father, goes missing and they discover Singapore Sling digging a deep hole in their backyard. As psychotic as these two are, they are still lucid enough to recognize that a killing is imminent, if not two or even three. In an atmosphere of decadence and dark madness, the characters gradually sink into the depths of their subconscious mind.

A few days later, the daughter decides that she is fed up with having to suffer under the yoke of maternal authority, and, together with Singapore Sling, murders her mother. Singapore Sling then takes what up until now used to be the mother's role in the sexual games. However, during one of these games, a reenactment of Laura's murder, he stabs the daughter, playing Laura, with the aforementioned missing kitchen knife now attached to his penis. The daughter, while bleeding to death, shoots Singapore Sling and then he goes out to the garden and falls into the pit which he himself had recently dug. The film hence ends, in short, with all three characters dead.

Cast
 Meredyth Herold as Daughter
 Panos Thanassoulis as Detective Singapore Sling
 Michele Valley as Mother

Reception

Director Nikos Nikolaidis said the following about this film's reception during an interview: "When I was shooting Singapore Sling, I was under the impression that I was making a comedy with elements taken from Ancient Greek Tragedy... Later, when some European and American critics characterized it as 'one of the most disturbing films of all times,' I started to feel that something was wrong with me. Then, when British censors banned its release in England, I finally realized that something is wrong with all of us."

Accolades

Legacy
The Icelandic neo-psychedelia band Singapore Sling is named after the film. As the band's frontman Henrik Björnsson explained in a June 2003 interview with Belgium's VRT Radio 1: "We had a first gig. It was booked and we didn't have a name and I had been looking for a film called Singapore Sling for a long time. I couldn't find it anywhere. It sounded cool, so that became the name of the band. It's some kind of dark, perverse Greek film from 1990. I haven't found it yet, so if you know someone who has it, please let me know. I hope it's good. A dark perverse noir film and a guy who has sex with a corpse. And he's called Singapore Sling." In November 2005, after the completion of his last film The Zero Years, a tale of perversion and sexual dominance which failed to replicate the earlier success of Singapore Sling, Nikolaidis declared his intention to stop making movies in order to deal with music.

References

Further reading
Mikela Fotiou, "Monstrous Women and the Subversion of Patriarchy in Nikos Nikolaidis’s Films Singapore Sling and See You in Hell, My Darling," Sixth Global Conference, 2014, "Evil, Women and the Feminine," Friday, 2 May 2014 – Sunday, 4 May 2014, Lisbon, Portugal, Sunday, 4 May 2014, 14:00, Ninth Session: "It’s Show Time!" Chair: Roger Davis.

External links
Singapore Sling at Nikos Nikolaidis (Film Director/Writer/Producer)

Singapore Sling at the Greek Film Archive Film Museum: Home Page, Digital Archives, Filmography
Singapore Sling at 5 Books, 6 Films, and... Nikos Nikolaidis: Films

Singapore Sling at The New York Times Movies
Singapore Sling at the TCM Movie Database

1990 films
1990s avant-garde and experimental films
1990s business films
1990 drama films
1990 independent films
1990 LGBT-related films
BDSM in films
Bisexuality-related films
1990s English-language films
Films about child abuse
Films about death
Films about diseases
Films about food and drink
Films about missing people
Films about pedophilia
Films about psychiatry
Films about slavery
Films directed by Nikos Nikolaidis
Films set in country houses
Films set in Greece
Films shot in Greece
Films shot in Athens
1990s French-language films
Greek black-and-white films
Greek drama films
1990s Greek-language films
Greek LGBT-related films
Incest in film
LGBT-related drama films
Necrophilia in film
Greek nonlinear narrative films
LGBT-related controversies in film
Obscenity controversies in film
Women and death
Greek avant-garde and experimental films
1990 multilingual films
Greek multilingual films